Actinoschoenus ramosus, commonly known as soft actinoschoenus, is a flowering plant in the sedge family, Cyperaceae, that is native to Western Australia throughout parts of the Kimberley region.

References

ramosus
Plants described in 2015
Angiosperms of Western Australia
Taxa named by Russell Lindsay Barrett
Taxa named by Matthew David Barrett
Taxa named by Barbara Lynette Rye